Shingo Tatsumi (巽 真悟, born January 10, 1987, in Higashimuro District, Wakayama) is a Japanese former professional baseball pitcher in Japan's Nippon Professional Baseball. He played for the Fukuoka SoftBank Hawks from 2009 to 2015.

External links

NPB stats

1987 births
Fukuoka SoftBank Hawks players
Japanese baseball players
Living people
Nippon Professional Baseball pitchers
Baseball people from Wakayama Prefecture